The European Round Table on Patent Practice (EUROTAB) is described as "a pan-European group consisting of lawyers (including European Patent Office (EPO) staff, and Commission, national patent offices) in the patent field", or a body where the national patent offices of the Contracting States of the European Patent Convention (EPC) and the European Patent Office come together to discuss differences in practice and see whether a harmonized approach is possible.

Along with the Standing Advisory Committee before the European Patent Office (SACEPO), a committee advising the European Patent Office on patent law issues, and the European Patent Judges' Symposium, EUROTAB is one of the most significant and institutionalised forums of legal professionals created and sponsored by the EPO. Already in the 1990s, "the strong interest and active participation of contracting states in these discussions confirm[ed] the growing importance of EUROTAB as an expert forum on patent practice in Europe".

Meetings
 1st, 6–7 April 1992, Munich, Germany
 2nd, 22–23 April 1993, Taastrup, Denmark
 3rd, 26–27 April 1994, Stockholm, Sweden
 4th, 9–10 May 1995, Newport, United Kingdom
 5th, 13–14 May 1996, Vienna, Austria
 6th, 22–23 May 1997, Paris, France
 7th, 28–29 May 1998, Lisbon, Portugal
 8th, 20–21 May 1999, Munich, Germany
 9th, 25–26 May 2000, Lyon, France
 10th, 10–11 May 2001, Madrid, Spain
 11th, 16–17 May 2002, Kilkenny, Ireland
 12th, 15–16 May 2003, Berlin, Germany
 13th, 13–14 May 2004, Budapest, Hungary
 14th, 12–13 May 2005, Taastrup, Denmark
 15th, 11–12 May 2006, Ljubljana, Slovenia
 16th, 10–11 May 2007, Prague, Czech Republic
 17th, 8–9 May 2008, Ankara, Turkey
 18th, 7–8 May 2009, Warsaw, Poland
 19th, 20–21 May 2010, Bucharest, Romania
 20th, 26–27 May 2011, Munich, Germany

References

External links
 EUROTAB (EPO web site)

European Patent Organisation
Legal conferences